Battle Nations is a freemium turn-based strategy multiplayer video game originally developed and published by Z2Live. On September 28, 2016, the game was officially shut down by Z2Live, along with many of their other titles. The game was then re-released by community creators on BattleNations.net in 2018 with development ongoing.

Gameplay
The game puts players in control of land with limited resources where effective management of resources is vital to expansion and advancement. Building a productive nation allows players to form armies which are the basis for the game's core: PvP combat in turn-based strategy warfare. It is impossible to "lose" in Battle Nations: even if the player has no buildings to generate gold, the player will always have enough gold to build a supply drop, which generates 100 gold every hour as well as 25 of iron, wood, and stone. Most of the technology in game is based on  that used by humans during WW2, although there are a few exceptions (e.g. velociraptors, mammoths, lasers, swords, plasma, railguns, etc.).

Battling 
Depending on the type of battle, this could mean a 9-block plot (arranged 3x3) or a 13-block plot (first and second row have 5, third row has 3). One unit fits into each plot, however there is a limit on how many units can be used for each battle. The battle is turn-based where the player selects a unit, an attack from the unit, and the targeted block (or, depending on the type of attack, the enemy unit). After the attack is played out, the enemy responds with an attack. The player may also forfeit their turn by clicking the "Pass" button, or the player can withdraw from the battle by clicking the white sign icon at the top-left corner.

Building 
The player's base, called their "Outpost", is their main way of collecting primary resources (by building Iron Mines, Coal Quarries, Oil Pumps, and Wood Loggers) and secondary resources (Steel is made by a Steel Mill with Iron and Coal, Lumber is by a Lumber mill made with Wood). Other important buildings include warehouses (small, medium, large, high-capacity), Barracks (used to train most troops), Hospitals, Vehicle Factories, and Vehicle Repair Bays. All of the previously mentioned buildings have premium versions which can be purchased using Nanopods.

Initially, only a small portion of the map is unlocked. The player must then buy land expansions to gain access to more land. The land expansions progressively get more expensive as well as take longer to complete.

All construction times for buildings as well as land expansions can be sped up with the use of Nanopods.

Nanopods
Nanopods are a rare resource in Battle Nations. With it, the user can buy units, buildings, speed up units and building formation, research new unit attacks, and finally buy resources the user lacks. The user can win them by leveling up (10 free nanopods granted to the player each level), buying them with real money, watching advertisements or achieving a specific rank in events (Boss Strikes or Arena Challenges). Units and buildings that require nanopods tend to be better than the ones requiring normal resources instead, but this is not always true. Promotional units, more powerful specialty units that are only available to purchase for a limited amount of time, all require nanopods to be acquired, increasing the value of nanopods. In the last week before Battle Nations was shut down 1,000,000 Nanopods were added to every Battle Nations account and many previously retired promotional units became available to players for purchase.

Plot 
Battle Nations also has a few major storylines as well as many smaller storylines (most of which were for limited edition events). Some major plot points include defeating Warlord Gantas (the antagonist boss of the Raiders), Attacking Rebel Forces (after they successfully take down the Imperial Forces), and confronting the Sovereign Navy (mainly by boats).

The characters that routinely assist in this plot include Lieutenant Morgan (who loves to drink whiskey), Sergeant Ramsey, Perkins, Dr. Aurora, and many more.

Development
Battle Nations is Z2Live's third game, following Trade Nations and MetalStorm. Z2Live released a video that described the inspiration behind the creation of Battle Nations. The concept for the game was inspired by Trade Nations users who provided feedback requesting additional PvP elements in the game.

Mid-Years & Events
Battle Nations grew quickly, and the playerbase became loyal and dedicated to the game.  'The Boss Strike', in which allies in guilds joined to get the highest score possible, and in turn receive special unit and resource rewards.  FotS was acknowledged by the Battle Nations community to be the victors of the final Boss Strike, much to the chagrin of BSR.  'Invasions' also presented opportunities for guild members to work together and compete against other guilds by defeating enemy invasions on their outposts.  'Arena Challenges', although controversial and 'pay-to-win', allowed players to square up against other players in Asynchronous player-versus-player combat.  With every event, a 'promotional unit' was released.  These units were purchasable by Nanopods, and in some cases, had incredible advantages over non-promotional units.  This led to the firm conviction by many of the players that the game was 'free-to-play, pay-to-win'.  Some of these more 'overpowered' promotional units assisted in the eventual demise of the game.

Final Days
In February 2015 it was announced that the Swedish development company King had purchased Z2 Live Inc, for $150M. Subsequently, Battle Nations was pulled from the Steam platform as of 16 April 2015. During this time, the game developers released fewer and fewer updates and events. On July 17, 2015, the game developers released the last update, focused on a new world boss and 2 eventual boss-strikes, along with some additional units.

On June 28, 2016, Z2 had announced a close, and have pulled any Z2–related game off the appstore, and any online service has now officially shut down as of September 28, 2016.

Shutdown and Rerelease 
Over the course of the next few years, plans for "inspired" spinoffs and direct fan recreations were announced. With the most prominent being Battle Nations Rewritten now simply called Battle Nations.

References

Turn-based strategy video games
Android (operating system) games
IOS games
MacOS games
Multiplayer and single-player video games
Video games developed in the United States
2011 video games
Windows games